List of journalists killed in Bangladesh is about journalists killed in Bangladesh while reporting or on account of their journalism.

According to the Committee to Protect Journalists, the organization has confirmed that 13 journalists have been killed in Bangladesh since 1992.

Journalist killed since 1992

Journalists killed during 1971

See also
Political repression of cyber-dissidents

References

External links 
 Committee to Protect Journalists
 UNESCO

 
Bangladesh
People killed in the Bangladesh Liberation War